Charles Howard was a gentleman at the court of Henry VIII of England.

Howard was the second son of Lord Edmund Howard and Joyce Culpeper, and the elder brother of Sir George Howard. As a scion of the mighty Howard family, his uncle, Thomas Howard, 3rd Duke of Norfolk, was able to find him a position at court. Charles' fortunes improved in 1540, when his sister Catherine Howard became the King's fifth wife. Charles went on to create a mesalliance with the King's niece, Margaret Douglas, the daughter of Henry's sister, Margaret Tudor, queen dowager of Scotland.

Ancestry

References

Bibliography

Year of birth missing
Year of death missing
Charles Howard (courtier)
Court of Henry VIII